Holder v. Humanitarian Law Project, 561 U.S. 1 (2010), was a case decided in June 2010 by the Supreme Court of the United States regarding the Patriot Act's prohibition on providing material support to foreign terrorist organizations (18 U.S.C. § 2339B). The case, petitioned by United States Attorney General Eric Holder, represents one of only two times in First Amendment jurisprudence that a restriction on political speech has overcome strict scrutiny. The other is Williams-Yulee v. Florida Bar.

The Supreme Court ruled against the Humanitarian Law Project, which sought to help the Kurdistan Workers' Party in Turkey and Sri Lanka's Liberation Tigers of Tamil Eelam learn how to resolve conflicts peacefully. It concluded that the US Congress had intended to prevent aid to such groups, even for the purpose of facilitating peace negotiations or United Nations processes because that assistance fit the law's definition of material aid as "training," "expert advice or assistance," "service," and "personnel." The finding was based on the principle that any assistance could help to "legitimate" the terrorist organization and free up its resources for terrorist activities.

The court noted that the proposed actions of the Humanitarian Law Project were general and "entirely hypothetical" and implied that a post-enforcement challenge to the application of the "material support" provisions was not prevented.

Reception 
Former President Jimmy Carter criticized the decision and argued:

Élisabeth Decrey Warner, the president of the Swiss NGO Geneva Call, also expressed her disapproval by stating, "Civilians caught in the middle of conflicts and hoping for peace will suffer from this decision. How can you start peace talks or negotiations if you don't have the right to speak to both parties?"

In January 2011, David D. Cole, a professor of law at Georgetown University Law Center, who argued the case for the Humanitarian Law Project, commented on developments since the decision. He noted that several prominent former officeholders, including Rudolph Giuliani and Tom Ridge, had spoken in support of the People's Mujahedin of Iran, an Iranian opposition group designated by the United States as a terrorist organization. He stated that he supported their right to speak but that even nonviolent advocacy, such as urging a designation as "terrorist" to be revoked, was illegal under the Supreme Court decision. He also pointed to exemptions granted under the rubric of "humanitarian aid" that turned out to include products like cigarettes and chewing gum. He stated, "Under current law, it seems, the right to make profits is more sacrosanct than the right to petition for peace, and the need to placate American businesses more compelling than the need to provide food and shelter to earthquake victims and war refugees."

The linguist Noam Chomsky criticized the decision as an issue of freedom of speech and stated that it was "the first major attack on freedom of speech in the United States since the notorious Smith Act back around 1940." He also stated that it had troubling legal implications since Humanitarian Law Project gave out advice to PKK to urge the group to pursue nonviolence.

The magazine Mother Jones stated that "the Supreme Court ruled that even protected speech can be a criminal act if it occurs at the direction of a terrorist organization." It went on to say that people "could be convicted of materially supporting terrorism merely for translating a document or putting an extremist video online, depending on [their] intentions."

Representatives of the International Red Cross and Red Crescent Movement stated that the ruling would probably not affect its operations or its relationship with the US government.

Implementation 
In September 2010, the FBI raided activists in Minneapolis and Chicago; seized computers, cellphones and files; and issued subpoenas to some targeted individuals to appear before a federal grand jury. The FBI agents were seeking evidence of ties to groups deemed by the US government to be foreign terrorist organizations, including the Revolutionary Armed Forces of Colombia and the Popular Front for the Liberation of Palestine. Attorneys linked the raids to the Holder decision.

See also 
 Anti-terrorism legislation
 Freedom of speech in the United States
 Incitement to terrorism
 List of United States Supreme Court cases, volume 561

References

Further reading

External links 
 
 The Supreme Court goes too far in the name of fighting terrorism (Washington Post)
 What Counts as Abetting Terrorists? (NYT)
 Andrew F. March, "A Dangerous Mind?" New York Times Sunday Review, April 22, 2012

2010 in United States case law
Patriot Act
United States Supreme Court cases
United States Supreme Court cases of the Roberts Court
Void for vagueness case law